Harry Fisher (28 May 1899 – 14 October 1982) was an Australian cricketer. He played eight first-class matches for South Australia between 1920 and 1924.

See also
 List of South Australian representative cricketers

References

External links
 

1899 births
1982 deaths
Australian cricketers
South Australia cricketers
Cricketers from Adelaide